Vijayakumar is an Indian film actor and politician. Along with predominant work in Tamil cinema since 1973, he has acted in a few Malayalam and Telugu movies as well as one Kannada. He also works in television serials.

He began as a child actor in the film Sri Valli in 1961. Vijaykumar was the little Lord Murugan in Sri Valli, starring Sivaji Ganesan and Padmini. Though not many offers were forthcoming for the little actor, he was supposed to play Lord Murugan in Kandhan Karunai, but instead Sivakumar played that role. Vijayakumar acted in a small role as one of the Lords that was arrested by Surapadman. In 1973, Vijayakumar got his first break in Ponnukku Thanga Manasu, directed by Devaraj-Mohan. The other hero in the film was Sivakumar. The success of Ponnuku Thanga Manasu got him a permanent place in Tamil cinema. Vijayakumar was a popular actor the seventies, who acted alongside leading actors such as M. G. Ramachandran, in Indru Pol Endrum Vaazhga, with Sivaji Ganesan in Dheepam and Kamal Haasan in Neeya. While Vijayakumar was a popular supporting actor, he did play the lead role during the 1970s, in films such as Aval Oru Thodarkathai, Mathura Geetham and Azhage Unnai Arathikkiren.

Vijayakumar continued to act in supporting roles in the early 1980s. After a brief slump, Vijayakumar's second innings came in 1988 with Mani Ratnam's Agni Natchathiram, where he played the role of Prabhu Ganesan and Karthik Muthuraman's father. The movie told the story of two half brothers who fight for their father's love and property. During the 1990s, Vijayakumar was frequently seen in father roles such as Nattamai and Baasha. During the same time, Vijayakumar also played lead roles in award-winning films such as Kizhakku Cheemayile and Anthimanthaarai, with Bharathiraaja. The latter took him close to winning the National Film Award for Best Actor, eventually missing it by one vote. Vijayakumar continued to play senior roles during the 2000s; eventually the actor was seen in more grandfather roles. In the last few years, the actor has reduced his film commitments and focused on television serials. Vijayakumar has acted in over 400 films, primarily in Tamil, but also had brief stints in Telugu cinema.

Following is the list of films acted by Vijayakumar. Besides Tamil, he has also acted in a few Telugu and Malayalam films.

Filmography

1960s

1970s

1980s

1990s

2000s

2010s

Television

References 

Indian filmographies
Male actor filmographies